Laura Dudas ( Czekaj; born November 3, 1978) is a Canadian politician and journalist who was elected to Ottawa City Council in the 2018 Ottawa municipal election representing Innes Ward. She was re-elected in the 2022 Ottawa municipal election in the re-named Orléans West-Innes Ward.

Early life 
Born and raised in Kitchener, Ontario, Dudas is the daughter of Richard Czekaj, a welder, and Linda Czekaj (nee Murchie), a Sears employee. She has a younger sister named Elizabeth. 

Dudas married Michael Dudas, a Royal Canadian Mounted Police officer, in 2008 and together they are parents to two children and a stepdaughter. The family moved to Blackburn Hamlet in 2006.

Education and early career 
Dudas attended Conestoga College in Kitchener, graduating with a diploma in Journalism. Dudas started her journalism career at the Cambridge Reporter, in Cambridge, before joining the newsroom at the Stratford Beacon Herald, in Stratford, Ontario. In 2002, she became a journalist at the Ottawa Sun, working in the newsroom until 2010. 

Following her journalism career, Dudas worked for the City of Ottawa as a Communications Coordinator and Strategist until 2018. Dudas served as the President of the Blackburn Community Association for eight years and was active on the board for 10 years. She chaired the Cancer Chase in 2015, a fundraiser for The Ottawa Hospital Foundation.

Dudas was a member of the former Orléans Chamber of Commerce prior to its amalgamation with the Ottawa Board of Trade. Dudas has been an active supporter of the Heart of Orléans Business Improvement Association and as a City Councillor, sits on the BIA’s Board of Directors as a non-voting member.

She is an associate member of the Orléans Branch of the Royal Canadian Legion.

Political career 
Dudas first ran for council in the 2014 Ottawa municipal election, coming in second to Jody Mitic. Dudas ran again in 2018, and won 41% of the vote, defeating the second-place candidate by nearly 1,700 votes.

Since 2018, Dudas has served as Deputy Mayor for the City of Ottawa. Additionally, Dudas serves as the Vice-Chair of the Finance and Economic Development Committee, she is a member on the Transportation Committee, the Community and Protective Services Committee, the Planning Committee, and sits on the City’s Solid Waste Sponsors Group and Climate Change Sponsors Group. Dudas also acts as Ottawa City Council’s liaison with the United Way East Ontario, sitting on their Board of Directors.

Electoral record

2014 Ottawa municipal election

2018 Ottawa Municipal Election

References

Living people
1978 births
Ottawa city councillors
Politicians from Kitchener, Ontario
Writers from Kitchener, Ontario
Canadian newspaper journalists
Canadian women journalists
Journalists from Ontario
21st-century Canadian journalists
Canadian women non-fiction writers
Women municipal councillors in Canada